The Color of Crime may refer to:

 The Color of Crime (1998 book), a book by Katheryn Russell-Brown
 The Color of Crime (New Century), a study by the New Century Foundation